Brownsburg High School is a public high school located in Brownsburg, Indiana. The school is located within the Brownsburg Community School Corporation, which is in Hendricks County.

History
Brownsburg graduated its first class in spring 1897.

Athletics
BHS athletic teams are nicknamed the Bulldogs and compete in the Hoosier Crossroads Conference. In 2020 it was announced that the Bulldogs received a uniform partnership with Jordan brand.

Performing arts
BHS fields four competitive show choirs: the mixed-gender "Spotlight Singers & Company", the all-female "Starlight Voices" and "Bella Voce", and the all-male "Dawg Pound". The program also hosts an annual competition, the Bulldog Spectacular.
BHS also has a top 20-ranking marching band: “The Sound of Brownsburg”. They have ranked 5th in the state of Indiana and 2nd at the Bands of America Bowling Green Regional competition. In 2021 they placed 1st at the NorthWest Regional Competition in Toledo, Ohio. They were also one of 10 bands invited to perform in the 95th Macy's Thanksgiving Day Parade. In their 2022 season, they made Bands of America Grand National finals for the first time is school history, placing 8th at that event. They also placed 4th in the state of Indiana, making it their highest placement in school history.

Notable alumni
Tucker Barnhart - Major League Baseball player
Chris Estridge - United Soccer League player
Gordon Hayward - NBA player
Chris Jones - National Football League player
Lance Lynn - Major League Baseball player
Mark Patrick - radio personality
Drew Storen - Major League Baseball player
Julian Mavunga - professional basketball player
Mark Titus - Former AAU teammate of Greg Oden and Mike Conley Jr., blogger

See also
 List of high schools in Indiana

References

External links

Public high schools in Indiana
Schools in Hendricks County, Indiana
1890s establishments in Indiana